The General Confederation of Italian Industry, commonly known as Confindustria, is the Italian employers' federation and national chamber of commerce, founded in 1910. It groups together more than 113,000 voluntary member companies, accounting for nearly 4,200,000 individuals. It aims to help Italy's economic growth, assisting, in doing so, its members. It is a member of the International Organisation of Employers (IOE). The President is Carlo Bonomi since 20 May 2020.

Confindustria was a founding member of several organizations, including ISTUD (Istituto Studi Direzionali) and Assingegneria (an organization set up by Confindustria, which has since merged with OICE, L'ingegneria italiana organizzata - which in itself belongs to Confindustria).

Members of Confindustria include ANIMA, Federation of the Italian Associations of Mechanical and Engineering Industries.

It owns the prominent newspaper Il Sole 24 Ore. With local chapters all over Italy, it is popularly synonymous with Italian business.

Branches

These are the main branches of the Confindustria association: 
 
 Federcostruzioni
 Federprogetti
 ACIMAC
 ACIMGA
 AFI
 AGIS. AIE
 AIMPES
 AISCAT
 ANAV
 ANDIL
 ANEPLA
 ANFAO
 ANFIA
 ANFIDA
 ANICA
 ANIGAS
 ANITEC
 APT
 ASSAEROPORTI
 ASSICA
 ASSISTAL
 ASSITOL
 ASSOBETON
 ASSOBIODIESEL
 ASSOBIRRA
 ASSOCARNI
 AICA
 ASSONCONSULT
 ASSOELETTRICA
 ASSOGAS
 ASSOIMMOBILIARE
 ASSOLOGISTICA
 ASSOMET
 ASSONAVE. ASSOTTICA
 ASSTEL
 CONFINDUSTRIA ANCMA
 Confindustria Ceramica
 Confindustria Intellect
 Confindustria Radio Televisioni
 Farmindustria
 Federpesca
 Federunacoma
 FEM
 FISE
 ITALGROB
 MINERACQUA
 TESSILIVARI
 UCIMU
 UNIC
 UNIVIDEO
 ACIMALL
 ACIMIT
 AGENS
 AIDEPI
 AIIPA
 AIOP
 AITEC
 ANCIT
 ANEF
 ANES
 ANDIA
 ANIASA
 ANICAV
 ANITA
 ANPAM
 ASSAEREO
 ASSALZOO
 ASSINFORM
 ASSITERNMINAL
 ASSIV
 ASSOBIBE
 ASSOBIOMEDICA
 ASSOCALZATURIFICI Italiani
 ASSOCARTA
 ASSOCOMAPLAST
 ASSOCONTROL
 ASSOFOND
 ASSOGRAFICI
 ASSOLATTE
 ASSOMAC
 ASSOMINERARIA
 ASSOSISTEMA
 ASSOVETRO
 CAGEMA
 Confindustria CECED Italia
 Confindustria Federorafi
 Confindustria marmomacchine
 Conditarma
 Federacciai
 Federterme
 Federvini
 FIMI
 IGAS
 ITALMOPA
 OICE
 UCIMA
 UCINA
 Unione Petrolifera.

Former Presidents
 Luigi Bonnefon (1910 – 1913)
 Ferdinando Bocca (1913 – 1918)
 Dante Ferraris (1918 – 1919)
 Giovanni Battista Pirelli (1919)
 Giovanni Silvestri (1919 – 1920) 
 Ettore Conti (1920 – 1921)
 Raimondo Targetti (1922 – 1923)
 Antonio Stefano Benni (1923 – 1934)
 Alberto Pirelli (1934)
 Giuseppe Volpi di Misurata (1934 – 1943)
 Giovanni Balella (1943)
 Giuseppe Mazzini (1943)
 Fabio Friggeri (1944 – 1945)
 Angelo Costa  (1945 – 1955)
 Alighiero De Micheli (1955 – 1961)
 Furio Cicogna  (1961 – 1966)
 Angelo Costa (1966 – 1970)
 Renato Lombardi (1970 – 1974)
 Gianni Agnelli (1974 – 1976)
 Guido Carli (1976 – 1980)
 Vittorio Merloni (1980 – 1984)
 Luigi Lucchini (1984 – 1988)
 Sergio Pininfarina (1988 – 1992)
 Luigi Abete (1992 – 1996)
 Giorgio Fossa (1996 – 2000)
 Antonio D'Amato (2000 – 2004)
 Luca Cordero di Montezemolo (2004 – 2008)
 Emma Marcegaglia (2008 – 2012)
 Giorgio Squinzi (2012 – 2016)
 Vincenzo Boccia (2016 – 2020)
 Carlo Bonomi (2020 – present)

See also
 Economy of Italy
 List of national employers' federations

References

External links
  
 Official site - English overview
 Confindustria and the Party System in Italy (PDF)

Business organisations based in Italy
1910 establishments in Italy
Rome Q. XXXII Europa